The Dublin Historical Record is a history journal established in 1938 and published biannually by the Old Dublin Society. Its focus is on the History of Dublin and it is considered to be a "learned journal".

References

External links
 Old Dublin Society

Publications established in 1938
Irish history journals
Biannual journals
English-language journals
History of Dublin (city)
1938 establishments in Ireland